Government Kilpauk Medical College (GKMC), founded in 1960, is a government medical institution in India. There are four hospitals attached to GKMC - Government Kilpauk Medical College Hospital. They are Government Royapettah Hospital, Government Thiruvotteeswarar Hospital of Thoracic Medicine, Government Peripheral Hospital, K.K.Nagar and Government Peripheral Hospital, Anna Nagar. The college is affiliated to The Tamil Nadu Dr. M.G.R. Medical University, Chennai. It offers a number of undergraduate and postgraduate programs.

The hospital is the third in the government sector, after the Rajiv Gandhi Government General Hospital and the Government Royapettah Hospital, to have a full-fledged emergency department, which includes triage area, resuscitation bay and colour-coded zones, per the Tamil Nadu Accident and Emergency Care Initiative (TAEI) guidelines. The hospital is recognised as a level II trauma care centre. The zero-delay ward of the hospital receives an average of 40 to 50 cases every day.

History 

1925 - In response to the feeling of Nationalism and keeping alive the ancient systems of indigenous medicine the school of Indian medicine was started. The degree conferred at this institution was L.I.M.
 
1947 In accordance to the recommendations of the Usman Committee, Chopra Committee and the Pundit Committee of Government of Madras and Government of India, the character of the institute was changed, upgraded and named as College of Indian Medicine. The college gave the degree as G.C.I.M.  
  
1948 The college was again renamed as College of Indigenous Medicine and one of the three systems of Indigenous Medicine, Ayurvedha-Siddha-Unani, should be chosen by each candidate who joins GCIM and Allopathic Medicine was common to all.  
  
1953 The college was renamed as the College of Integrated Medicine. The course was shortened to 4.5 years and one year of compulsory house-surgeoncy on par with MBBS course. Government ensured that the GCIM graduates could practice both the systems of medicine. In 1959 the first batch of GCIM students were admitted and in 1960 the College of Indigenous Medicine was closed.
 
1960 The Integrated Medicine Course (MBBS degree) was started. The first and second year GCIM students were given the option of joining the MBBS course, while the senior students were offered the D.M&S on completion of the course and bringing them into the allopathic fold.
 
1965  The college was recognised as Women Medical College and named as Government Kilpauk Medical College, admitting only women candidates for MBBS degree. Meanwhile, those who had completed GCIM, D.M&S were given the option to undertake condensed MBBS course at the Chengalpattu Medical College to obtain the MBBS degree and come into the fold of modern medicine.
 
1967 The women students agitated to have a co-educational institution and the erstwhile Government of Madras granted permission. Both men and women were admitted to the MBBS degree from 1967.  
  
1972 Development of the Medical College was set into pace with the Surgical Block coming into being. Later all the different super-specialities came into being between 1972 and 2001.
  
1981 Intensive Care Unit was sanctioned with 10 beds and was commissioned in June 1981 by Hon. Dr. H.V. Hande, the Minister for Health, Government of Tamil Nadu. A 50 bedded comprehensive burn unit was sanctioned on the I floor of the out-Patient Block and was commissioned in March 1985 by Hon. Dr. H.V. Hande, then Minister for Health under the Presidency of Dr. Lalitha Kameswaran, then Director of Medical Education.  
  
1984  Department of Cardiology was sanctioned with Prof. S. Thanikachalam as its Chief.
  
1987  Department of Nephrology was sanctioned and commissioned in July 1987 with Prof. C.M. Thiagarajan as its Chief.
 
1988 Department of Surgical Gastroenterology was sanctioned with Prof. Srikumari Damaodharan as its Chief.

BATCHES

• Dynamics 2000

• Sigaram 2001

• Swasam 2002 

• Vasantham 2003

• Agni 2004 

• Nakshatraz 2005

• Thendral 2006 

• Rhythmz 2007 

• Valiantz 2008 

• Ruthraz 2009 

• Sarithraaz 2010

• Xorticanz 2011

• Varshaas 2012 

• Mithraaz 2013 

• Yukthaaz 2014 

• Sharvaas 2015

• Dhruvaaz 2016 

• Rithvaaz 2017 

• Udhiraaz 2018

• Asthraaz 2019

• Dheeraaz 2020

Affiliation 
The college is affiliated to The Tamil Nadu Dr. MGR Medical University.

Postgraduate programs

Previously, the seats in the different postgraduate programs (diploma and degree programs) were filled by:
State level PG Entrance Exam (TNPG)
National level PG Entrance Exam (AIPGME)

Since 2017, there are no separate entrance exams, and a candidate has to qualify a single entrance exam, National Eligibility cum Entrance Test (NEET), to get into a post-graduate seat. 
 
Details of diploma, postgraduate degree and higher specialty courses

Postgraduate diploma course
 Diploma in Obstetrics & Gynecology
 Diploma in Child Health
 Diploma in Oto-Rhino-Laryngology
 Diploma in Anaesthesia
 Diploma in Orthopaedics
 Diploma in Clinical Pathology

Postgraduate degree course
 M.D.General Medicine
 M.D.Pathology
 M.D.Microbiology
 M.D.Obstetrics & Gynaecology
 M.D.Physiology
 M.D.Paediatrics 
 M.D.Anaesthesiology
 M.S.General Surgery
 M.S.E.N.T.
 M.S.Orthopaedics
 M.D.Community medicine
 M.D.Tuberculosis and Respiratory Medicine
 M.D.Psychiatry
 M.D.Radio diagnosis
 M.D.Forensic Medicine

Postgraduate higher speciality degree course
 D.M. Gastroenterology
 D.M. Nephrology
 M.Ch. Urology
 M.Ch. Plastic Surgery
 M.Ch. Surgical Oncology

Chennai Metro Rail
The Chennai Metro Rail project took 2,756 sq.m. of land from the Kilpauk Medical College for the construction of the Metro station.

References

External links 

 

Educational institutions established in 1960
Medical colleges in Tamil Nadu
Universities and colleges in Chennai
Hospitals in Chennai
1960 establishments in Madras State
Academic institutions formerly affiliated with the University of Madras